Burns Township is one of twenty-four townships in Henry County, Illinois, USA.  As of the 2010 census, its population was 265 and it contained 130 housing units.

Geography

Unincorporated towns
 German Corner at 
(This list is based on USGS data and may include former settlements.)

Adjacent townships
 Cornwall Township (north)
 Annawan Township (northeast)
 Kewanee Township (east)
 Wethersfield Township (southeast)
 Galva Township (south)
 Cambridge Township (west)
 Munson Township (northwest)

Cemeteries
The township contains these two cemeteries: Cosner and Mount Zion.

Major highways
  Illinois Route 81

Demographics

School districts
 Annawan Community Unit School District 226
 Cambridge Community Unit School District 227
 Galva Community Unit School District 224
 Kewanee Community Unit School District 229
 Wethersfield Community Unit School District 230

Political districts
 Illinois's 14th congressional district
 State House District 74
 State Senate District 37

References
 
 United States Census Bureau 2008 TIGER/Line Shapefiles
 United States National Atlas

External links
 City-Data.com
 Illinois State Archives
 Township Officials of Illinois

Townships in Henry County, Illinois
Townships in Illinois